Kevin McMahon (born May 26, 1972, in San Jose, California) is a retired track and field athlete from the United States, who competed in the hammer throw. McMahon graduated from Georgetown University in 1994 with an AB in English and Fine Arts. He represented his native country at two consecutive Summer Olympics, starting in 1996.  A two-time USA Champion (1997 and 2001) he claimed the silver medal at the 1999 Pan American Games in Winnipeg, Manitoba, Canada. He is currently a member of the Faculty of Fine Arts at his alma mater Bellarmine College Preparatory. McMahon is also a member of Art of the Olympians (AOTO).

Achievements

References

 
DESC Profile

1972 births
Living people
American male hammer throwers
Athletes (track and field) at the 1999 Pan American Games
Athletes (track and field) at the 1996 Summer Olympics
Athletes (track and field) at the 2000 Summer Olympics
Olympic track and field athletes of the United States
Male weight throwers
Pan American Games track and field athletes for the United States
Georgetown University alumni
Pan American Games medalists in athletics (track and field)
Pan American Games silver medalists for the United States
Track and field athletes from San Jose, California
Medalists at the 1999 Pan American Games